Darby O'Gill is a fictional Irishman who appears in the writings of Irish author Herminie Templeton Kavanagh, including her books Darby O'Gill and the Good People (1903) and Ashes of Old Wishes and Other Darby O'Gill Tales (1926).

Film
In 1959, the Walt Disney adapted Kavanaugh's works to the silver screen under the title Darby O'Gill and the Little People. In the film, O'Gill is an aging groundskeeper who engages in a friendly battle of wits with a leprechaun king, and is played by the actor Albert Sharpe.

Music
At least two American Irish-music bands have taken O'Gill's name under which to perform. Darby O'Gill operates in Portland, Oregon, while Darby O'Gill and the Little People center their performances in Las Vegas. Apart from the use of the name, the two bands have no connection.

References

Fictional Irish people